True Blood is a 1989  American action-drama film written and directed  by Frank Kerr and starring Jeff Fahey,  Chad Lowe  and Sherilyn Fenn.

Plot 
Teenager Ray Trueblood (Fahey) is wrongfully accused of murdering a police officer after his fellow gang member Billy Masters (Drago) does the deed. Hoping to elude the police, he flees Brooklyn, NY and joins the U.S. Marines. Returning 10 years later, Trueblood is dismayed to learn that his younger brother Donny (Lowe) is now running with a gang led by Masters. Trueblood soon finds himself depending on his military training & experience to protect his friends and family from the ruthless Masters.

Cast 
 
 Jeff Fahey as  Raymond Trueblood 
 Chad Lowe as  Donny Trueblood 
 Sherilyn Fenn as  Jennifer Scott 
 James Tolkan as  Det. Joseph Hanley 
 Ken Foree as  Det. Charlie Gates 
 Billy Drago as  Billy 'Spider' Masters 
 Brodie Greer as  Det. Tony Williams 
 John Capodice as Frank Santos
  Leon Addison Brown  as Roach
  Stanley Perryman  as Blade
  Everett Mendes III  as Bobby Gaines  
  Shawn O'Neil  as Woody McCaffrey 
 Robert LaSardo as Luis

References

External links 

1989 action films
American action films
1980s English-language films
1980s American films
1989 films